Lignicida is a genus of moths of the family Erebidae. The genus was erected by Charles Swinhoe in 1905.

Species
Lignicida echana C. Swinhoe, 1905
Lignicida grisechana Holloway, 2005

References

Calpinae
Noctuoidea genera